Susan George may refer to:

 Susan George (actress) (born 1950), English film and television actress
 Susan George (political scientist) (born 1934), Franco-American political and social scientist
 Susan Elizabeth George (born 1949), author

See also
 Suzane George (active from 2007), Indian television actress